Robert Likens Condon (November 10, 1912 – June 3, 1976) was a U.S. Representative from California from 1953 to 1955.  During World War II he served in the United States Army.

Career
Born in Berkeley, California, Condon attended the public schools. He graduated from the University of California at Berkeley in 1934 and from the law college of the same university in 1938. He was editor in chief of the California Law Review in 1938 and was admitted to the California bar in the same year. Between 1938 and 1942 he served as attorney for the National Labor Relations Board.

He served with the Office of Price Administration in 1942 as chief enforcement attorney for northern California and later as regional investigator for five Western States. Condon entered the United States Army as a private in December 1942. He served overseas in the European Theater with Company G, Three Hundred and Tenth Infantry Regiment, Seventy-eighth Division, in France, Belgium, and Germany. He was discharged in February 1946 as a staff sergeant, having been decorated with two battle stars and the Silver Star. He engaged in private practice of law in 1946 in Martinez, California and served as a member of California State Assembly 1948–52.

Condon was elected as a Democrat to the Eighty-third Congress (January 3, 1953 – January 3, 1955). He was an unsuccessful candidate for reelection in 1954 to the Eighty-fourth Congress. He resumed law practice in Martinez, California. After his death in Walnut Creek, California, on June 3, 1976, aged 63. Condon was cremated and his ashes were scattered at sea, three miles beyond the Golden Gate Bridge, San Francisco, California.

References

Sources

Join California Robert L. Condon

1912 births
1976 deaths
University of California, Berkeley alumni
Berkeley High School (Berkeley, California) alumni
Politicians from Berkeley, California
Democratic Party members of the United States House of Representatives from California
Recipients of the Silver Star
United States Army soldiers
UC Berkeley School of Law alumni
20th-century American politicians
United States Army personnel of World War II
Democratic Party members of the California State Assembly